Ben Halvorson (September 18, 1863 – November 6, 1933) was an American farmer, businessman, and politician.

Born in the town of New Hope, Portage County, Wisconsin, Halverson went to Stevens Point High School in Stevens Point, Wisconsin. He was a farmer and a dealer in pumps and windmills. From 1903 to 1907, Halverson was the county treasurer for Portage County. He also served as the New Hope town chairman. Halverson was chairman of the Portage County Board of Supervisors and was a Republican. In 1923 and 1925, Halverson served in the Wisconsin State Assembly. Halverson died at his farm house in New Hope, Wisconsin.

Notes

1863 births
1933 deaths
People from Portage County, Wisconsin
Businesspeople from Wisconsin
Farmers from Wisconsin
County officials in Wisconsin
County supervisors in Wisconsin
Mayors of places in Wisconsin
Republican Party members of the Wisconsin State Assembly